NGC 2516 (also known as Caldwell 96) is an open star cluster in the southern sky in the constellation Carina discovered by Abbe Lacaille in 1751-1752. It is also called Southern Beehive or  the Sprinter.

Description
This bright cluster itself is easily visible with the naked eye as a hazy patch, but is resolvable into stars using binoculars. It contains two 5th magnitude red giant stars and three main visual double stars: HJ 4027, HJ 4031 and I 29. A small telescope would be required to split the double stars, which are all pairs of 8-9 magnitude and 1-10 arcseconds separation.

NGC 2516 and the recently discovered nearby star cluster Mamajek 2 in Ophiuchus have similar age and metallicity. Recently, kinematic evidence was presented by E. Jilinski and coauthors that suggests that these two stellar groups may have formed in the same star-forming complex some 135 million years ago.

The cluster is surrounded by the 500-parsec diameter halo consisting of stars ejected from cluster.

References

Bibliography 

 Burnham, Robert. Burnham's Celestial Handbook. Dover, 1978. .

External links

 
 SEDS – NGC 2516

2516
Open clusters
Carina (constellation)
096b